Monster Truck Madness 2 is a monster truck racing video game developed by Terminal Reality and published by Microsoft for the PC (Windows 95/NT) in 1998. It is the sequel to Monster Truck Madness for the same platform, and was one of the first racing games to feature an online multiplayer mode. Online play for it was available on the MSN Gaming Zone until early 2006.

The game was ported to the Nintendo 64 in 1999 by Edge of Reality. It was co-published with Rockstar Games and released as Monster Truck Madness 64. The game is known for featuring popular monster trucks like Bigfoot, Grave Digger and Carolina Crusher, as well as WrestleTrucks —monster trucks named after WCW talent.

Overview 

This sequel offers improved graphics, an updated interface, new trucks and tracks and the addition of variable weather conditions when compared to its predecessor. The game is known for featuring the biggest names in monster truck racing like Bigfoot, Grave Digger and Carolina Crusher, as well as WrestleTrucks —monster trucks named after WCW talent. It was one of the first racing games to feature an online multiplayer mode. However, the game engine is essentially the same, and most custom trucks and tracks are compatible with both games. The game contains assets from older Terminal Reality games, like Hellbender and CART Precision Racing.

The "Summit Rumble" king of the hill tracks could only be played if the player intended to compete online.  Again, "Army" Armstrong provides commentary for the game. However, his race calls have been updated, and new ones have been added. Just like its predecessor, it contains an inaccessible truck, "Chuck's Car" (a Chevrolet Camaro). It was intended to be unlocked by typing in "CHUCK" in a race. The game still displays this message when typed: "Restart the game to drive Chuck's Car". If one restarts the game, it is not there.

The Microsoft Sidewinder Force Feedback wheel's installation CD also contains the game. The game's file mounting systems gives the possibility to add (or remove) custom tracks and trucks to the game using different editors.

Development and release
Monster Truck Madness was released on August 31, 1996, and is the first entry in the Madness series of racing titles distributed by Microsoft. American video game studio Terminal Reality, Inc. designed Monster Truck Madness to accurately simulate monster truck events such as drag tracks and enclosed circuit races, and replicate the titular off-road vehicles on land, when jumping, and during collisions. Sound effects of the trucks were recorded and digitized from such races. The game's twelve monster trucks were used under license from companies like Bigfoot 4×4, Inc., the owner of Bigfoot and Snake Bite. The developer hired announcer Army Armstrong to perform sports commentary, resulting in lines such as "Bigfoot is doing it in the air!" and "when it's going your way, it's going your way". Terminal Reality developed Monster Truck Madness 2 as a sequel to the original which features more trucks and tracks. The game features licensed WCW-themed WrestleTrucks and uses the Photex2 game engine for improved graphics and physics. It was released in North America on May 13, 1998, as a Windows title.

Monster Truck Madness 64
Monster Truck Madness 64 is a Nintendo 64 port of Monster Truck Madness 2 developed by Edge of Reality and published by Rockstar Games. It was released in 1999. It received advertisement time on World Championship Wrestling programming and features trucks styled after WCW wrestlers. In addition, one commercial spot featured WCW wrestler Kevin Nash.

Reception

Monster Truck Madness 2 received favorable reviews, while Monster Truck Madness 64 received "mixed" reviews, according to the review aggregation website GameRankings.

GameSpot said of the PC version, "The designers wisely recognized that the subtlety of monster truck racing cried out for the added nuance that only a professional wrestling tie-in could bestow." Computer Games Stretegy Plus gave the same PC version three stars out of five, calling it "the same cheesy, superficial, arcade racer it was last year—consider this a graphics upgrade with some new tracks and leave it at that." An unnamed reviewer of Next Generations August 1998 issue called the same PC version "a definite improvement." Fifteen issues later, however, Doug Trueman of the same magazine (now labeled NextGen) said of Monster Truck Madness 64, "If you want intense off-road racing, play EA's Beetle Adventure Racing instead and run this title over with your car." Adam Roff of Hyper gave the latter 68%, calling it "a lack-lustre conversion of what was a decent PC title. It isn't racing and it isn't wrestling and it isn't fun." Scott Alan Marriott of AllGame gave the same console version two-and-a-half stars out of five, saying, "Monster Truck Madness offers almost everything you'd expect from an Arcade racer except for tight control; the developers decided to make these trucks extremely hard to keep on the road, which ultimately destroys the atmosphere of the game."

Notes and references

Footnotes

Citations

External links

1998 video games
Microsoft games
Monster truck video games
Multiplayer and single-player video games
Nintendo 64 games
Off-road racing video games
Rockstar Games games
Video game sequels
Video games developed in the United States
Windows games
Terminal Reality games